John Molo (born December 5, 1953, Bethesda, Maryland) is an American rock and jazz drummer and percussionist. He has played with a variety of bands, combos, and soloists. Best known for being the drummer for Bruce Hornsby and the Range, he has also played with The Other Ones, Phil Lesh and Friends, Delaney Bramlett, John Fogerty, Keller Williams, Mike Watt, Paul Kelly, David Nelson, Jemimah Puddleduck, and Modereko.

Biography

Early Years
John Molo was born in Bethesda, Maryland of mostly Irish descent. His surname is Swiss-Italian but his other three grandparents all emigrated from Ireland. He was raised Catholic in Washington, D.C. His father was an oceanographer who became increasingly concerned about the safety of the inner city and, when Molo was 12, the family moved to suburban Virginia, where Molo attended Langley High School in nearby McLean, Virginia. While at Langley Molo played in the school's nationally renowned jazz ensemble, the Langley High Jazz Lab, under the direction of band director George Horan.

Later career
Molo was the drummer for Bruce Hornsby and the Range when the band won the Grammy Award for Best New Artist of 1986. After the Range disbanded in 1990, Molo continued to collaborate and tour with Hornsby until 1998.

In May 2009, Molo joined the band Moonalice.

Discography
The Way It Is — Bruce Hornsby and the Range (1986)
Scenes From the Southside — Bruce Hornsby and the Range (1988)
A Night on the Town — Bruce Hornsby and the Range (1990)
Harbor Lights — Bruce Hornsby (1993)
Wanted Man — Paul Kelly (1994)
Ball-Hog or Tugboat? — Mike Watt (1995)
Hot House — Bruce Hornsby (1995)
Spirit Trail — Bruce Hornsby (1998)
The Strange Remain — The Other Ones (1999)
Jemimah Puddleduck — Jemimah Puddleduck (2000)
Modereko — Modereko (2001)
Meisner, Swan & Rich  — Meisner, Swan & Rich (2001)
Trumpet Ride — Willie Waldman (2001)
There and Back Again — Phil Lesh and Friends (2002)
Solar Igniter — Modereko (2003)
Intersections (1985-2005) — Bruce Hornsby (2006)
The Long Road Home - In Concert — John Fogerty (2006)
Live at the Warfield — Phil Lesh and Friends (2006)
Dream — Keller Williams (2007)
A New Kind Of Blues —  Delaney Bramlett (2008)
Walk Through the Fire — Mark Karan (2009)

References

External links
Bruce Hornsby and the Range 1986 Grammy award for Best New Artist, Grammy.com; accessed December 11, 2017.
Weingarten, Marc. Review of "The Strange Remain", Rolling Stone, February 8, 1999
John Molo interview, Digital Interviews; accessed December 11, 2017.
Flaherty, John. "Phil and Friends Endless Journey", JammedOnline.com; accessed December 11, 2017.
John Molo interview, jambands.com, August 20, 2001
Jackson, Blair. John Molo 2007 interview,  dead.net; accessed December 11, 2017.
John Molo profile, SABIAN.com; accessed December 11, 2017.

1953 births
Living people
American jazz drummers
American rock drummers
Bruce Hornsby and the Range members
Grammy Award winners
People from Washington, D.C.
People from Fairfax County, Virginia
Musicians from Washington, D.C.
The Other Ones members
American people of Irish descent
20th-century American drummers
American male drummers
People from Bethesda, Maryland
Catholics from Virginia
Catholics from Maryland
Jazz musicians from Virginia
Jazz musicians from Maryland
American male jazz musicians